Alive & Wild is a live album released by American country rock band the Ozark Mountain Daredevils. It was recorded live during the fall of 2010 at the Wildwood Springs Lodge in Steelville, Missouri. The album is a two-disc set, with 21 tracks including old favorites, some rare songs, and a couple of new ones.

Track listing
Disc 1
"Standing On The Rock"
"Noah"
"Southern Cross"
"Colorado Song"
"Homemade Wine"
"Chicken Train"
"Yours and Mine"
"Fly Away Home"
"Ooh Boys (It's Hot)"
"E.E. Lawson"

Disc 2
"Walkin' Down The Road"
"Arroyo"
"It Probably Always Will"
"The Vine & The Rose"
"Black Sky"
"Ode to Mel Bay"
"You Made It Right"
"Gonna Buy Me a Car"
"If You Wanna Get To Heaven"
"Beauty In The River"
"It'll Shine When It Shines"

Personnel
Steve Cash
John Dillon 
Michael "Supe" Granda
Dave Painter 
Kelly Brown
Ron Gremp
Bill Jones
Ruell Chappel
Nick Sibley

References

The Ozark Mountain Daredevils albums
2010 live albums